Stołczyn is a municipal neighbourhood of the city of Szczecin, Poland situated on the left bank of the Oder river, north of the Szczecin Old Town, and Middle Town. As of January 2011 it had a population of 4,459.

Before 1945 when Stettin was a part of Germany, the German name of this suburb was Stettin-Stolzenhagen.

References

Neighbourhoods of Szczecin